Eisenach Station is the main station of the city of Eisenach in the German state of Thuringia. It is a transportation hub, located on the Thuringian Railway (Berlin/Dresden–) Halle–Bebra (–Frankfurt am Main) and at the Werra Railway (Eisenach–Meiningen–Eisfeld).

Eisenach station is classified by Deutsche Bahn as a category 3 station.

Facilities 
Facilities available at the station are a flower shop, a shop for food and travel supplies as well as a bookshop. In addition, in 2009, a Subway opened in the former waiting room. The station has facilities for the disabled, including a lift to all platforms. Deutsche Bahn has a service point (open 6:00 a.m. to 10:30 p.m.) and a travel centre with tourist information. There is a taxi rank directly outside the station. A car rental agency is nearby.

History

1840-1900 
The construction of the Thuringian Railway was agreed to under a treaty signed on 20 December 1841 between the Kingdom of Prussia, the Grand Duchy of Saxe-Weimar-Eisenach and the Duchy of Saxe-Coburg and Gotha. At the same time planning had started on a line from Eisenach to Meiningen. The Erfurt–Eisenach section opened on 24 June 1847. The first Eisenach station was built at ground level in 1846–1847 and opened as an interim terminal station on the Gotha–Fröttstädt–Wutha–Eisenach section on 24 June 1847. The line was continued west two years later on 18 August 1849, with the section to Hörschel, now a suburb of Eisenach opened for excursion traffic. The line was connected to Gerstungen on 25 September 1849, closing the gap with the Hessian Frederick William Northern Railway.

From 1856 Eisenach developed into a railway junction with the opening of the Werra Railway on 2 November 1858. Already the Thuringian railway had been duplicated between Eisenach and Apolda. Eisenach station was expanded between 1859 and 1861 and again in 1885. In 1882 and 1895 the railway companies serving the station were acquired as Prussian state railways. On 1 August 1897, Eisenach tramways began operating from the station forecourt.

1900-1945 
In 1900 a major renovation began on the railway facilities: The railway line in the city area was raised by three to four metres and the station building was rebuilt. Also, the goods yard was rebuilt with a hump. On 12 April 1904 the rebuilt station building was opened, along with a post office.

Between 1922 and 1926 this work was followed by the construction of a railway depot in the eastern part of the goods yard along with a roundhouse. By 1928 the reception building was again too small, and an extension was built for the ticket office. Various works were built, including a facility for train supervision and a large yard for general freight. A modern electro-mechanical signal box and new signalling with an Indusi train detection system were installed.

Routes / lines 
The station is served by the following long-distance and regional services in the 2019 timetable:

Tracks
The station has six platform tracks, four of which are for long distance operations. Between tracks two and three there is an access track to the freight depot. In addition, the station has extensive trackage for parking regional and long distance trains.

East of the passenger station is the goods yard. Freight trains are reconstituted here to run on the Werra line or to various points in the region or in the opposite direction.

East of the freight station is the Eisenach depot and the former workshop. The facilities were closed by Deutsche Bahn in 2001 and sold. The entire area was bought in 2004 by the Uwe Adam Railway Company Ltd (Uwe Adam Eisenbahnverkehrsunternehmen GmbH) for its headquarters.

References

Notes

Sources

External links 

 
 

Railway stations in Thuringia
Buildings and structures in Eisenach
Railway stations in Germany opened in 1846
Railway stations in Germany opened in 1900